Megachile continua is a species of bee in the family Megachilidae. It was described by Mitchell in 1930.

References

Continua
Insects described in 1930